This is a list of the number-one hits of 1994 on Italian Hit Parade Singles Chart.

References

1994
One
1994 record charts